"Lois Comes Out of Her Shell" is the seventh episode of the eleventh season and the 195th overall episode of the animated comedy series Family Guy. It originally aired on Fox in the United States on November 25, 2012, and is written by Danny Smith and directed by Joe Vaux. In the episode, Lois has a midlife crisis leaving Peter desperately trying to keep up with her. Meanwhile, Stewie adopts a turtle from the park, but the turtle is determined to kill Stewie.

Plot
Lois is not looking forward to her birthday, but Brian suggests throwing her a surprise party. After Peter reads a poem that lowers Lois' spirits even further, she decides to turn her life around by adopting a different, younger lifestyle with longer hair after a makeover and shopping trip. Lois' lifestyle causes conflict within Peter, who is not sure about the changes but certainly likes most of Lois' new persona. But her new lifestyle soon begins to wear on him. When he gets tired at a party, he becomes a drag on Lois and she splits to party with younger girls.

Back home, Brian points out to Peter that Lois is behaving like this because of the poem Peter read to her. On television, a report regarding Justin Bieber shows Lois hanging out with the teen girls. Lois sneaks into the concert intending to seduce Bieber but Peter bursts in and beats him up. After Peter demands that Lois come home and start acting her age she refuses, citing what he said to her. Peter apologizes and admits that he really loves Lois for who she is. When Bieber is called back onstage, Peter is forced to substitute "Conway Bieber".

Meanwhile, Stewie finds a turtle in a pond in a park and decides to take him back home as his pet and names him Sheldon. Sheldon decides to avenge his removal from his natural environment by ruining Stewie's life. When Stewie has a close call with Sheldon in the vicinity he begins to get suspicious. Sheldon's revenge attempt is revealed late one night and Stewie is forced to flush him down the toilet. When he reaches the end of the sewer pipe, he returns for more revenge. Stewie finds Rupert's and a stranger's head in boxes and vows to get even with Sheldon. After Sheldon bursts into Stewie's room for a showdown, Stewie nearly loses his fight until Mario jumps on Sheldon and kills him, claiming that his life of "jumping on turtles" isn’t exciting, but he has to stick with it.

Reception
The episode received a 2.9 rating and was watched by a total of 5.77 million people, making it the second most watched show on Animation Domination that night, beating The Cleveland Show and Bob's Burgers but losing to The Simpsons with 7.46 million. The episode was met with mixed reviews from critics. Kevin McFarland of The A.V. Club gave the episode a B−, reviewing it as having telegraphed plot developments and typical sitcom themes, but nonetheless superior to previous episodes' lack of structure and joke execution. Carter Dotson of TV Fanatic gave the episode three and a half stars out of five, commenting positively on the coherence of the plot and the Conway Bieber gag, but with "some misgivings about just how genuine this episode’s newfound heart was."

References

Attribution:

External links 
 

2012 American television episodes
Family Guy (season 11) episodes